Getting to Happy is the sequel to Waiting to Exhale by author Terry McMillan. The novel follows the lives of four African-American friends in Phoenix, Arizona in 2005. McMillan decided to write the sequel after her divorce from Jonathan Plummer, the inspiration for How Stella Got Her Groove Back. The book was released in 2010.

Plot summary
The novel picks up 15 years after Waiting to Exhale ends. Savannah has since married but decides to divorce her husband and be single again at the age of 51. Bernadine is on much better terms with her first ex-husband John than with her second ex-husband James, who turned out to be a con artist. She also suffers from an addiction to prescription pills. Gloria deals with the heart-breaking death of her husband Marvin and the marital problems of her now grown son Tarik. Robin realizes that, at 50, she has yet to accomplish one of the goals of her life: to wear a wedding dress. She keeps trying on men like shoes until she finds one that fits, and in the meantime is busy raising her now teenaged daughter Sparrow.

References

Novels by Terry McMillan
2010 American novels
Novels set in Phoenix, Arizona
Fiction set in 2005
African-American novels
Viking Press books